Michael Andrew Clarke (born 24 August 1970 in Melbourne, Australia) is a former Australian mogul skier.  He won the Junior World Mogul Championships in 1989, Australia's first ever skiing world championship win. Not just Australia's first skiing world champion but Australia's first world champion in any of the winter Olympic sports.

From Falls Creek, Clarke, won the mogul event at the junior world championships in Sälen [sæːlen] locality Sweden. The only other Australian to win a world championship skiing medal was Malcolm Milne, who won a downhill bronze in 1967.

Film

Clarke did stunt work for Jackie Chan in the film First Strike, produced partially at Falls Creek, as a stunt skier and snowmobiler.

Early life 

In early life Clarke had a fond affiliation with mathematics "It's not physics, it's proven!". Pulled out of his final year of school while building a small but crude robot to take on the world at skiing and left that type of science behind too take on medical science.

Current work 

After completion of an IT degree in 2007 Clarke now runs a successful web application development business, Fnesse. Specialising in Web application Development and Design, Search Engine Optimisation (SEO) and online marketing utilising tools such as Facebook, Twitter, Google+ and LinkedIn. And has built, documented and runs an online a guide to the Victoria's, The Mornington Peninsula.

Mike also continues with his affiliation (mainly pain management) to medical science due to the number of injuries obtained through competitive skiing.

Honours
Clarke received an Australian Sports Medal in 2000

References

Living people
Australian male freestyle skiers
1970 births
https://www.pmc.gov.au/government/its-honour/australian-sports-medal